Nehale IyaMpingana Constituency is an electoral constituency in the Oshikoto Region of Namibia, named after Nehale lya Mpingana, one of Namibia's National Heroes. It was created in August 2013, following a recommendation of the Fourth Delimitation Commission of Namibia, and in preparation of the 2014 general election. The administrative centre of Nehale lyaMpingana is the settlement of Okoloti.  the constituency had 5,879 registered voters.

The constituency borders the constituencies of Guinas, Omuthiyagwiipundi Constituency, Eengodi, and Okankolo.

Politics
Nehale IyaMpingana constituency is traditionally a stronghold of the South West Africa People's Organization (SWAPO) party. 

In the 2015 local and regional elections the SWAPO candidate won uncontested and became councillor after no opposition party nominated a candidate. The SWAPO candidate also won the 2020 regional election. Josef Shilongo received 2,245 votes, well ahead of Vilho Mwapopi of the Independent Patriots for Change (IPC), an opposition party formed in August 2020, with 189 votes.

See also
 Administrative divisions of Namibia

References

Constituencies of Oshikoto Region
States and territories established in 2013
2013 establishments in Namibia